Bronze Medallion may refer to:

Bronze Medallion (Canada)
Bronze Medallion (New York City award)
Bronze Medallion (New Zealand and Australia)
Bronze Medallion (United Kingdom)
Bronze Retirement Medallion, of the U.S. CIA

See also
 Bronze (disambiguation)
 Medallion (disambiguation)
 Bronze Award (disambiguation)
 Bronze Medal (disambiguation)
 Bronze Star Medal
 Bronze star (disambiguation)